Don't Buy This (also known as Don't Buy This: Five of the Worst Games Ever) is a compilation of video games for the ZX Spectrum released on 1 April 1985. As described on the box, it contains five of the poorest games submitted to publisher Firebird. Instead of rejecting the submissions, they decided to mock the original developers by releasing them together and publicly brand it as "unoriginal" and "awful". Firebird even disowned all their copyright to the game and encouraged buyers to pirate it at will.

Reviews for the game were universally negative, with critics questioning how to critique the game due to its publicity being based on it being a collection of bad games. Despite the negative reception, the game was a commercial success.

Games
Fido 1: The player controls a dog named Fido to defeat moles and birds to protect an area for several levels. Fido also needs to keep eating in order to stay alive. In the later levels, enemies such as a low flying canary and a cat which throws projectiles at you are added, but their attacks are very easy to avoid.
Fido 2: Puppy Power: Features similar gameplay as the original Fido, but Fido can now move up and down instead of just left and right. In addition to Fido being able to defeat enemies with its tail, used as an attack in the previous game, Fido can now shoot laser beams from its eyes in order to destroy other enemies and gain health.
Fruit Machine: The player controls an animated, low-resolution slot machine with reels that spin rather slowly. The instructions sarcastically describe the game as a "mysterious, original new game [that] requires skill, timing, nerve and absolute concentration". It also suggests that you should play the game in the middle of the night. The music is an 8-bit medley of short tunes that play when the player wins. 
Race Ace: A racing game where the player controls a light blue race car that can only turn 90 and 180-degree angles. The game is impossible to win, regardless of the speed setting of the player's car because the computer-controlled cars advance more quickly every time the player turns. The controls have the tendency to freeze if another car invades your space. On one screen, the game is erroneously titled "Ace Racer".
Weasel Willy: A game where a purported weasel, which in actuality has the appearance of a humanoid figure in-game, has to avoid trees that are completely green and its own large, uniform footprints. The trees spawn in random locations whenever a level starts, so the weasel may be blocked by trees, preventing the player from being able to play the level. The weasel may even start a level with a tree occupying the same space as it does, causing immediate loss of the level.

Release

Don't Buy This was published by Telecomsoft under the Firebird label. Firebird disowned the game upon release, with Firebird's marketing manager James Leavey claiming that the game "wasn't released — it just escaped!" The publisher also encouraged copying the game, offering a chance to win a sticker or badge for people who wrote to the company about the game. It was released on 1 April 1985 under Firebird's Silver Range for £2.50.

Reception

Your Spectrum wrote: "The games aren't that bad as do-it-yourself games but, they won't provide that much fun." Sinclair User said it contained "five of the most uninspired games ever to disgrace the Spectrum."

A reviewer for Computer and Video Games noted that the game was difficult to give a score due to it being publicised as being a collection of bad games, but declared it to be "good for a laugh". 

John Szczepaniak from Hardcore Gaming 101 featured the game as part of their "Your Weekly Kusoge" column. Szczepaniak, while describing the games as "uninspired, dull and lazy", he did not consider them to be the worst games on the ZX Spectrum. Despite the negative criticism towards the game, Retro Gamer in 2005 reported that it was a commercial success.

See also 
Cassette 50 - Another compilation game for the ZX Spectrum, consisting of unintentionally low quality titles
Action 52 - A compilation of 52 games, all of them containing major glitches
 List of video games notable for negative reception

References

External links
 
 

1985 video games
Parody video games
Telecomsoft games
Video game compilations
Video games developed in the United Kingdom
ZX Spectrum games
ZX Spectrum-only games